Cyclophora argenticristata is a moth in the  family Geometridae. It is found in Brazil.

References

Moths described in 1901
Cyclophora (moth)
Moths of South America